1998 was designated as the International Year of the Ocean.

Events

January
 January 6 – The Lunar Prospector spacecraft is launched into orbit around the Moon, and later finds evidence for frozen water, in soil in permanently shadowed craters near the Moon's poles.
 January 11 – Over 100 people are killed in the Sidi-Hamed massacre in Algeria.
 January 12 – Nineteen European nations agree to forbid human cloning.
 January 17 – The Drudge Report breaks the story about U.S. President Bill Clinton's alleged affair with Monica Lewinsky, which will lead to the House of Representatives' impeachment of him.

February
 February 3 – Cavalese cable car disaster: A United States military pilot causes the deaths of 20 people near Trento, Italy, when his low-flying EA-6B Prowler severs the cable of a cable-car.
 February 4 – The 5.9  Afghanistan earthquake shakes the Takhar Province with a maximum Mercalli intensity of VII (Very strong). With up to 4,000 killed, and 818 injured, damage is considered extreme.
 February 7–22 – The 1998 Winter Olympics are held in Nagano, Japan.
 February 20 – Iraq disarmament crisis: Iraqi President Saddam Hussein negotiates a deal with U.N. Secretary General Kofi Annan, allowing weapons inspectors to return to Baghdad, preventing military action by the United States and Britain.
 February 28
 A massacre in Likoshane, FR Yugoslavia starts the Kosovo War.
A study led by Andrew Wakefield is published in The Lancet suggesting an alleged link between MMR vaccine and autism. Now known to be full of data manipulation, the study was instantly controversial and fueled the nascent anti-vaccination movement. Although subsequent large epidemiological research found no link between vaccines and autism, the study contributed – in the following years and decades – to a sharp drop in vaccination rates and the resurgence of measles in several countries. The study, fully retracted in 2010, was later characterised as "perhaps the most damaging medical hoax of the 20th Century".

March
 March 2 – Data sent from the Galileo probe indicates that Jupiter's moon Europa has a liquid ocean under a thick crust of ice.
 March 5 – NASA announces that the Clementine probe orbiting the Moon has found enough water in polar craters to support a human colony and rocket fueling station.
 March 11 – 1998 Danish general election: Prime Minister Poul Nyrup Rasmussen is re-elected.
 March 13 – The High-Z Supernova Search Team becomes the first team to publish evidence that the universe is expanding at an accelerating rate.
 March 23 – The 70th Academy Awards ceremony, hosted for the 6th time by Billy Crystal, is held at the Shrine Auditorium in Los Angeles, California. Titanic wins 11 Oscars including Best Picture.
 March 26 – Oued Bouaicha massacre in Algeria: 52 people are killed with axes and knives; 32 of the killed are babies under the age of two.

April
 April 5 – In Japan, the Akashi Kaikyō Bridge linking Shikoku with Honshū and costing about US$3.6 billion, opens to traffic, becoming the largest suspension bridge in the world.
 April 10 – Good Friday Agreement: An hour after the end of the talks deadline, the Belfast Agreement is signed between the Irish and British governments and most Northern Ireland political parties, with the notable exception of the Democratic Unionist Party.
 April 20 – The alleged date the German Red Army Faction (created 1970) is dissolved.
 April 23 – The Yugoslav Army ambushes a group of Kosovo Liberation Army fighters attempting to smuggle weapons from Albania into Kosovo, killing 19.

May
 May 11
 India conducts three underground nuclear tests in Pokhran, including one thermonuclear device.
 The first euro coins are minted in Pessac, France. Because the final specifications for the coins were not finished in 1998, they will have to be melted and minted again in 1999.
 May 13–14 – Riots directed against Chinese Indonesians break out in Indonesia, killing around 1,000 people.
 May 19
 The Galaxy IV communications satellite fails, leaving 80–90% of the US's pagers without service.
 The wreck of the aircraft carrier , sunk during the Battle of Midway in 1942, is found near Midway Atoll by a team led by former US Navy officer Robert D. Ballard.
 May 21 – Suharto (elected 1967) resigns after 31 years as President of Indonesia, effectively ending the New Order period. It is his 7th consecutive re-election by the Indonesian Parliament (MPR). Suharto's hand-picked Vice President, B. J. Habibie, becomes Indonesia's third president.
 May 28 – Nuclear testing: In response to a series of Indian nuclear tests, Pakistan explodes five nuclear devices of its own in the Chaghai hills of Baluchistan, codenamed Chagai-I, prompting the United States, Japan and other nations to impose economic sanctions. Pakistan celebrates Youm-e-Takbir annually.
 May 30
 A 6.5 magnitude earthquake hits northern Afghanistan, killing up to 5,000.
 A second nuclear test, codenamed Chagai-II, is conducted and supervised by the Pakistan Atomic Energy Commission (PAEC).

June
 June 1 – European Central Bank established, replacing the European Monetary Institute.
 June 3 – Eschede train disaster: an Intercity-Express high-speed train derails between Hanover and Hamburg, Germany, causing 101 deaths.
 June 7 – Former Brigadier-General Ansumane Mané seizes control over military barracks in Bissau, marking the beginning of the Guinea-Bissau Civil War (1998–99).
 June 10–July 12 – The 1998 FIFA World Cup in France: France beats Brazil 3–0 in the FIFA World Cup Final.
 June 10 – The Organisation of African Unity passes a resolution which states that its members will no longer comply with punitive sanctions applied by the UN Security Council against Libya.
 June 27 – Kuala Lumpur International Airport officially opens, becoming the new international gateway into Malaysia.
 June 30 – Philippine Vice President Joseph Estrada is sworn in as the 13th President of the Philippines.

July
 July 5 – Japan launches a probe to Mars, joining the United States and Russia as an outer space-exploring nation.
 July 17
 At a conference in Rome, 120 countries vote to create a permanent International Criminal Court to prosecute individuals for genocide, crimes against humanity, war crimes, and the crime of aggression.
 In Saint Petersburg, Nicholas II of Russia and his family are buried in St. Catherine Chapel, 80 years after he and his family were killed by the Bolsheviks in 1918.
 The 7.0  Papua New Guinea earthquake shakes the region near Aitape with a maximum Mercalli intensity of VIII (Severe). This submarine earthquake triggered a landslide that caused a destructive tsunami, leaving more than 2,100 dead and thousands injured.
 July 21 – September 5 – The 1998 Sydney water crisis involved the suspected contamination by the microscopic pathogens cryptosporidium and giardia of the water supply system of Greater Metropolitan Sydney.
July 24 – Russell Eugene Weston Jr. enters the United States Capitol Building and opens fire, killing two members of the United States Capitol Police, Jacob Chestnut and John Gibson.

August
 August 4 – The Second Congo War begins; 5.4 million people die before it ends in 2003, making it the bloodiest war, to date, since World War II.
 August 7
 Yangtze River Floods: in China the Yangtze river breaks through the main bank; before this, from August 1–5, peripheral levees collapsed consecutively in Jiayu County Baizhou Bay. The death toll exceeds 12,000, with many thousands more injured.
 1998 U.S. embassy bombings: the bombings of the United States embassies in Dar es Salaam, Tanzania, and Nairobi, Kenya, kill 224 people and injure over 4,500; they are linked to terrorist Osama bin Laden, an exile of Saudi Arabia.
 August 15 – The Troubles: The Omagh bombing is carried out in Northern Ireland by the Real Irish Republican Army. Shortly after these events, the group would call a ceasefire in response, signaling an end to the 30+ year conflict. 
 August 26 – Clube de Regatas Vasco da Gama wins the Libertadores Cup after a 2–1 win against Barcelona S.C.

September
 September 2
 A McDonnell Douglas MD-11 airliner (Swissair Flight 111) crashes near Peggy's Cove, Nova Scotia, after taking off from New York City en route to Geneva; all 229 people on board are killed.
 A United Nations court finds Jean-Paul Akayesu, the former mayor of a small town in Rwanda, guilty of nine counts of genocide, marking the first time that the 1948 law banning genocide is enforced.
 September 4 – Google, Inc. is founded in Menlo Park, California, by Stanford University PhD candidates Larry Page and Sergey Brin.
 September 5 – The Government of North Korea adopts a military dictatorship on its 50th anniversary.
 September 8 – St. Louis Cardinals first baseman Mark McGwire hits his 62nd home run of the season, thus breaking the single season record of 61 which had been held by Roger Maris since 1961.
 September 10 – At midnight, a shooting occurs aboard an Akula-class nuclear-powered attack submarine of the Russian Navy docked in the northern Russian port city of Severomorsk.
 September 12 – The Cuban Five intelligence agents are arrested in Miami, and convicted of espionage. The agents claim they were not spying against the United States Government but against the Cuban exile community in Miami.
September 24 – Iranian President Mohammad Khatami retracts a fatwa against Satanic Verses author Salman Rushdie that was in force since 1989 stating that the Iranian government will "neither support nor hinder assassination operations on Rushdie".
 September 29 – Nipah virus epidemic begins in Malaysia.

October
 October 1 – Europol is established when the Europol Convention signed by all of its member states comes into force.
 October 3 – 1998 Australian federal election: John Howard's Liberal/National Coalition Government is re-elected with a substantially reduced majority, defeating the Labor Party led by Kim Beazley.
 October 6 – Matthew Shepard, a gay University of Wyoming student, is beaten and left for dead outside of Laramie, Wyoming. The subsequent media coverage, followed by his death on October 12, opens a larger conversation on homophobia in the United States.
 October 10 – Indictment and arrest of Augusto Pinochet: General Augusto Pinochet, Chilean dictator from 1973 to 1990, is indicted for human rights violations he committed in Chile by Spanish magistrate Baltasar Garzón. 6 days later British police place him under house arrest during his medical treatment in the UK. This is a leading case in the law of universal jurisdiction.
 October 17 – 1998 Jesse pipeline explosion: An oil pipeline explosion in Jesse, Nigeria results in 1,082 deaths.
 October 29
 Hurricane Mitch makes landfall in Central America, killing an estimated 11,000 people.
 STS-95: Former astronaut John Glenn returns to space, as a payload specialist.
 Gothenburg discothèque fire: 63 are killed and 213 injured in an arson fire.

November
 November 11 – Tencent, a multinational technology company, is founded in Shenzhen, China.
 November 20 – A Russian Proton rocket is launched from the Baikonur Cosmodrome in Kazakhstan, carrying the first segment of the International Space Station, the 21-ton Zarya Module.
 November 24 – A declassified report by Swiss International Olympic Committee official Marc Hodler reveals that bribes had been used to bring the 2002 Winter Olympics to Salt Lake City during bidding process in 1995. The IOC, the Salt Lake Organizing Committee, the United States Olympic Committee and the United States Department of Justice immediately launch an investigation into the scandal.

December
 December 4 – The Space Shuttle Endeavour launches the first American component to the International Space Station, the  Unity module on STS-88. It docks with Zarya two days later.
 December 6 – Hugo Chávez, politician and former member of the Venezuelan military, is elected President of Venezuela.
 December 14 – The Yugoslav Army ambushes a column of 140 Kosovo Liberation Army militants attempting to smuggle arms from Albania into Kosovo, killing 36. 
 December 16 – Iraq disarmament crisis: U.S. President Bill Clinton orders airstrikes on Iraq. UNSCOM withdraws all weapons inspectors from Iraq.
 December 19 – The U.S. House of Representatives forwards articles of impeachment against President Clinton to the Senate, making him the second president to be impeached in the nation's history.
 December 29 – Khmer Rouge leaders apologize for the post-Vietnam War genocide in Cambodia that killed more than one million people in the 1970s.
 December 31
 The first leap second since June 30, 1997, occurs.
 In the Eurozone, the currency rates of this day are fixed permanently.

Date unknown
 European Small Business Alliance organization is formed.
 Ibrahim Hanna, the last native speaker of Mlahsô, dies in Qamishli, Syria, making the language effectively extinct. Also, the last native speaker of related Bijil Neo-Aramaic, Mrs. Rahel Avraham, dies in Jerusalem.
 The Neelwafurat.com company is founded in Beirut, Lebanon.

Births

January

 January 1 – Sara Ahmed, Egyptian weightlifter
 January 4 – Coco Jones, American actress and singer 
 January 8 – Manuel Locatelli, Italian footballer  
 January 9 – Alek Manoah, American baseball pitcher 
 January 11 
 Louisa Johnson, English singer
 Odessa Young, Australian actress 
 Salih Özcan, Turkish footballer 
 January 12 – Juan Foyth, Argentine footballer
 January 15 – Chloe Kelly, English footballer
 January 13 
 Gabrielle Daleman, Canadian figure skater
 Chris Nilsen, American athlete
 January 17 
 Anthony Zambrano, Colombian sprinter
 Lovro Majer, Croatian footballer 
 January 18 
 Vashti Cunningham, American track and field athlete
 Lisandro Martínez, Argentine footballer 
 January 20 – Frances Tiafoe, American tennis player 
 January 21 
 Pervis Estupiñán, Ecuadorian footballer 
 Borna Sosa, Croatian footballer 
 January 22 – Silentó, American rapper
 January 23 – XXXTentacion, American rapper (d. 2018)
 January 24 – Emil Jakobsen, Danish handball player
 January 27 – Albina Kelmendi, Albanian-Kosovan singer and songwriter
 January 28 – Ariel Winter, American actress and voice actress
 January 29 – Jorge Martín, Spanish motorcycle racer
 January 31 – Amadou Haidara, Malian footballer

February

 February 3 – Yang Hao, Chinese diver
 February 4 
 Scott Jones, English paralympic athlete
 Malik Monk, American basketball player 
 Maximilian Wöber, Austrian footballer 
 February 6 – Adley Rutschman, American baseball catcher 
 February 8 – Rui Hachimura, Japanese basketball player 
 February 11 
 Niklas Kaul, German decathlete
 Khalid, American singer and songwriter 
 Josh Jacobs, American football running back 
 February 14 – Sander Berge, Norwegian footballer 
 February 15 
 Zachary Gordon, American actor
 George Russell,  British racing driver 
 February 17 
 Mohamed Katir, Moroccan born-Spanish middle-distance runner
 Devin White, American football linebacker 
 February 21 – Ella-Rae Smith,  English actress and model 
 February 24 – Remy Gardner, Australian motorcycle racer
 February 27 – Elisa Balsamo, Italian cyclist
 February 28 – Teun Koopmeiners, Dutch footballer

March

 March 2 – Tua Tagovailoa, American football quarterback 
 March 3 – Jayson Tatum, American basketball player 
 March 5 
 Bo Bichette, American baseball shortstop 
 Merih Demiral, Turkish footballer 
 March 7 – Amanda Gorman, American poet and activist 
 March 10 – Justin Herbert, American football quarterback 
 March 13 
 Jack Harlow, American rapper 
 Shaoang Liu, Hungarian short track speed skater 
 March 16 – Lil Keed, American rapper (d. 2022) 
 March 17 – Brandon Aiyuk, American football wide receiver
 March 18 
 Miltiadis Tentoglou,  Greek track and field athlete 
Abigail Cowen, American actress and model 
 March 20 – Letesenbet Gidey, Ethiopian long-distance runner
 March 22 – Paola Andino, Puerto-Rican-American actress
 March 25 – Vergil Ortiz Jr., American professional boxer 
 March 26 – Satoko Miyahara, former Japanese figure skater
 March 28 
 Sandi Lovrić, Slovenian footballer 
 Ryan Simpkins, American actress 
 March 30 – Kalyn Ponga, Australian rugby league footballer 
 March 31 – Anna Seidel, German short track speed skater

April

 April 3 
 Paris Jackson, American actress and model
 Wout Faes, Belgian footballer 
 April 6 
 Peyton List, American actress and model
 Nahuel Molina, Argentine footballer
 April 9 – Elle Fanning, American actress and model 
 April 10 
 Anna Pogorilaya, Russian figure skater
 Fedor Chalov, Russian footballer 
 April 15 
 Dorsa Derakhshani, Iranian chess player
 Derrick Brown, American football defensive tackle 
 April 19 
 Patrik Laine, Finnish ice hockey player 
 Zhang Yufei, Chinese swimmer 
 April 20 – Felix Mallard, Australian actor 
 April 21 – Jarrett Allen, American basketball player 
 April 22 – David Raum, German footballer 
 April 23 – Brian Burns, American football defensive end 
 April 26 – Jan-Krzysztof Duda, Polish chess grandmaster
 April 27 
 Cristian Romero, Argentine footballer 
 Drake Batherson, Canadian ice hockey player 
 April 29 
 Ella Hunt, English actress and singer 
 Apriyani Rahayu, Indonesian badminton player
 April 30 – Olivia DeJonge, Australian actress

May

 May 2 
 Jonathan Ikoné, French footballer 
 Ian Anderson, American baseball pitcher 
 Tremaine Edmunds, American football linebacker 
 May 4 – Rex Orange County,  English singer, multi-instrumentalist and songwriter
 May 5 
 Tijana Bogdanović, Serbian taekwondo practitioner 
 Aryna Sabalenka, Belarusian tennis player 
 Jordan Kyrou,  Canadian ice hockey player 
 May 7 
 MrBeast (Jimmy Donaldson), American YouTuber
 Dani Olmo, Spanish footballer 
 May 9 – Douglas Luiz, Brazilian footballer 
 May 12 – Mohamed Bamba, American basketball player 
 May 14 – Aaron Ramsdale, English footballer 
 May 18 – Polina Edmunds, former American figure skater
 May 19 – Alex Král, Czech footballer 
 May 23 
 Salwa Eid Naser, Bahraini track and field sprinter 
 Steve Lacy,  American singer, musician, songwriter, and record producer 
 May 24 – Daisy Edgar-Jones, British actress 
 May 28 – Dahyun, South Korean singer, rapper, and dancer
 May 29
 Markelle Fultz, American basketball player 
 Lucía Gil, Spanish singer and actress

June

 June 1 – Aleksandra Soldatova, former Russian rhythmic gymnast
 June 4 – Central Cee, British rapper and songwriter 
 June 5 
 Yulia Lipnitskaya, former Russian figure skater
 Maxim Burov, Russian freestyle skier
 Dave, British rapper 
 June 11 
 Charlie Tahan, American actor
 Wilma Murto, Finnish pole vaulter 
 June 14 
 Alina Boz, Russian-born Turkish actress
 Brianne Tju, American actress 
 June 15 
 Alexander Samarin, Russian figure skater
 Filippo Tortu, Italian sprinter
 June 16 
 Ritsu Doan, Japanese footballer 
 Maddie Musselman, American water polo player
 June 19
 Suzu Hirose, Japanese actress and model
 Viktoriya Zeynep Güneş, Turkish swimmer 
 Atticus Shaffer, American actor
 June 23 – Josip Brekalo, Croatian footballer 
 June 24 – Pierre-Luc Dubois, Canadian ice hockey player 
 June 25 
Kyle Chalmers, Australian swimmer 
Desmond Bane, American basketball player
 June 28 – Pedro Gonçalves, Portuguese footballer 
 June 29 – Michael Porter Jr.,  American basketball player 
 June 30 – Houssem Aouar, French footballer

July

 July 1 – Chloe Bailey, American singer, songwriter, and actress
 July 7 – Dylan Sprayberry, American actor
 July 8
 Maya Hawke, American actress and model
 Jaden Smith, American rapper, singer, songwriter, and actor
 Daria Spiridonova, former Russian artistic gymnast
 July 9 – Robert Capron, American actor
 July 10
 Kimia Alizadeh, Iranian taekwondo athlete
 Haley Pullos, American actress
 Angus Cloud, American actor 
 July 12 – Shai Gilgeous-Alexander, Canadian basketball player 
 July 15 – JayDaYoungan, American rapper (d. 2022) 
 July 16 – Rina Matsuno, Japanese singer, model, and actress (d. 2017)
 July 18 – Devin Bush Jr., American football inside linebacker 
 July 21 
 Kim Magnus, South Korean Olympic cross-country skier
 Marie Bouzková, Czech tennis player 
 July 22
 Madison Pettis, American actress and model
 Federico Valverde, Uruguayan footballer 
 July 23 – Deandre Ayton, Bahamian basketball player 
 July 24 
 Bindi Irwin, Australian television personality and conservationist
 Cailee Spaeny, American actress and singer 
 July 28 – Frank Ntilikina, French basketball player
 July 29 – Clayton Keller, American ice hockey player 
 July 31 – Rico Rodriguez, American actor

August

 August 2 – Sophie Hansson, Swedish swimmer 
 August 3 – Cozi Zuehlsdorff, American actress, pianist, and singer
 August 4 – Lil Skies, American rapper 
 August 5 – Mimi Keene, English actress
 August 6 – Ceylin del Carmen Alvarado, Dominican-born Dutch cyclist
 August 7 – Jalen Hurts, American football player 
 August 8 
 Shawn Mendes, Canadian singer-songwriter
 Ryan Garcia, American professional boxer
 August 9
 Jorrit Croon, Dutch hockey player
 Panagiotis Retsos, Greek footballer
 August 10
 Diptayan Ghosh, Indian chess grandmaster
 Eythóra Thorsdóttir, Dutch gymnast
 August 11 – Juan Miguel Echevarría, Cuban long jumper 
 August 12 
 Stefanos Tsitsipas, Greek tennis player 
 Rudy Pankow, American actor
 Nguyễn Thúc Thùy Tiên, Vietnamese beauty queen and model, Miss Grand International 2021 
 August 13
 Arina Averina, Russian rhythmic gymnast
 Dina Averina, Russian rhythmic gymnast
 Francisco Cerúndolo, Argentine tennis player
 August 16 – Özge Törer, Turkish actress
 August 18 – Tenshin Nasukawa, Japanese kickboxer and mixed martial artist
 August 20 – Paulo André de Oliveira, Brazilian sprinter
 August 24 
 Marc Hirschi, Swiss cyclist
 P. J. Washington, American basketball player 
 August 25
 Abraham Mateo, Spanish singer and actor
 China Anne McClain, American actress and singer
 August 26 – Trey Cunningham, American hurdler
 August 27 
 Kevin Huerter, American basketball player 
 Matheus Nunes, Portuguese footballer 
 August 28 – Weston McKennie, American footballer

September

 September 5 – Matteo Rizzo, Italian figure skater
 September 9 – Choi Min-jeong, South Korean short track speed skater
 September 10 – Sheck Wes, American rapper
 September 18 – Christian Pulisic, American soccer player
 September 19 – Trae Young, American basketball player 
 September 20 
 Marco Arop, Canadian middle-distance runner
 Trevon Diggs, American football cornerback
 Rashid Khan, Afghan cricket player
 September 21 
 Miguel Tanfelix, Filipino actor
 Tadej Pogačar, Slovenian cyclist 
 September 28
 Máscara de Bronce, Mexican wrestler
 Aleksandra Goryachkina, Russian chess Grandmaster

October

 October 1 – Guilherme Costa, Brazilian swimmer 
 October 2 – Alessandro Miressi, Italian swimmer 
 October 4 – Christopher Lillis, American freestyle skier
 October 7 – Trent Alexander-Arnold, English footballer
 October 10 
 Nash Aguas, Filipino actor and politician
 Fabio Di Giannantonio, Italian motorcycle racer
 October 14 – Kenny Bednarek, American track and field sprinter
 October 17 
 Erin Kellyman English actress
 Devin Haney, American professional boxer 
 October 20 – Nikita Ababiy, American professional boxer
 October 22 
 Ianis Hagi, Romanian footballer
 Roddy Ricch, American rapper
 October 23 – Amandla Stenberg, American actress and singer
 October 25 – Juan Soto, Dominican baseball outfielder
 October 27 – Dayot Upamecano, French footballer
 October 28
 Nolan Gould, American actor
 Perrine Laffont, French mogul skier
 October 29
 Maria Kharenkova, Russian artistic gymnast
 Lance Stroll, Canadian racing driver
 October 30 – Cale Makar, Canadian ice hockey player

November

 November 1 – Marie-Antoinette Katoto, French footballer
 November 2 – Elkie, South Korean based singer and actress
 November 3 – Maddison Elliott, Australian paralympic swimmer
 November 4 – Achraf Hakimi, Moroccan footballer
 November 5 – Takehiro Tomiyasu, Japanese footballer
 November 11 – Liudmila Samsonova, Russian tennis player
 November 12 
 Elias Pettersson, Swedish ice hockey player
 Jules Koundé, French footballer 
 Marco Bezzecchi, Italian motorcycle racer 
 November 14 
 Sofia Kenin, American tennis player
 DeVonta Smith, American football wide receiver
 November 17 – Kara Hayward, American actress 
 November 23 – Bradley Steven Perry, American actor
 November 29 – Ayumu Hirano, Japanese snowboarder

December

 December 2 
 Juice Wrld, American rapper and singer (d. 2019)
 Annalise Basso,
 December 4 – Si Yajie, Chinese diver
 December 5 – Conan Gray, American singer
 December 6 – Joe Fraser, British artistic gymnast
 December 8 – Matthew Wilson, Australian swimmer 
 December 14 
 Maggie Voisin, American freestyle skier
 Lukas Nmecha, German footballer 
 Lonnie Walker IV, American basketball player 
 December 16 – Zhou Jieqiong, Chinese singer
 December 17 – Martin Ødegaard, Norwegian footballer
 December 18 
 Paola Egonu, Italian volleyball player
 Simona Quadarella, Italian swimmer
 December 19 – Frans Jeppsson Wall, Swedish singer
 December 20 – Kylian Mbappé, French football player
 December 22
 G Hannelius, American actress and singer
 Casper Ruud, Norwegian tennis player
 Latto, American rapper
 December 24 – Nikita Howarth, New Zealand paralympic swimmer
 December 28 – Jared Gilman, American actor
 December 29
 Paris Berelc, American actress and model
 Victor Osimhen, Nigerian footballer
 December 30 – Jutta Leerdam, Dutch speed skater

Deaths

January

 January 1 
 Åke Seyffarth, Swedish speed skater (b. 1919)
 Helen Wills, American tennis player (b. 1905)
 January 4 
 Carlo Ludovico Bragaglia, Italian film director (b. 1894)
 Mae Questel, American actress (b. 1908)
 January 5 – Sonny Bono, American singer, actor, and politician (b. 1935)
 January 6 – Georgy Sviridov, Soviet and Russian composer (b. 1915)
 January 7 – Vladimir Prelog, Croatian chemist (b. 1906)
 January 8 – Michael Tippett, English composer (b. 1905)
 January 9 – Kenichi Fukui, Japanese chemist (b. 1918)
 January 11 – Klaus Tennstedt, German conductor (b. 1926)
 January 15
 Duncan McNaughton, Canadian Olympic athlete (b. 1910)
 Gulzarilal Nanda, Indian politician and economist (b. 1898)
 Junior Wells, American harmonica player (b. 1934)
 January 19 – Carl Perkins, American guitarist (b. 1932)
 January 21 – Jack Lord, American actor (b. 1920)
 January 23 
 Hilla Limann, President of Ghana (b. 1934)
 Alfredo Ormando, Italian writer (b. 1958)
 January 26 – Shinichi Suzuki, Japanese musician and educator (b. 1898)
 January 28 – Shotaro Ishinomori, Japanese manga artist (b. 1938)

February

 February 2
 Haroun Tazieff, French volcanologist and geologist (b. 1914)
 Raymond Cattell, British and American psychologist (b. 1905)
 February 3 – Karla Faye Tucker, American convicted murderer (b. 1959)
 February 6
 Falco, Austrian rock musician (b. 1957)
 Carl Wilson, American musician, singer, and songwriter (b. 1946)
 Nazim al-Kudsi, 26th Prime Minister of Syria and 14th President of Syria (b. 1906)
 February 8
 Halldór Laxness, Icelandic writer (b. 1902)
 Enoch Powell, British politician (b. 1912)
 Julian Simon, American economist and author (b. 1932)
 February 9 – Maurice Schumann,  French Minister of Foreign Affairs (b. 1911)
 February 17 – Ernst Jünger, German military hero, philosopher and entomologist (b. 1895)
 February 23 – Philip Abbott, American actor (b. 1924)
 February 24 – Henny Youngman, English-born comedian (b. 1906)
 February 26 – Theodore Schultz, American economist (b. 1902)
 February 27
 George H. Hitchings, American scientist (b. 1905)
 J. T. Walsh, American actor (b. 1943)
 February 28 – Dermot Morgan, Irish actor and comedian (b. 1952)

March

 March 1 – Jean Marie Balland, French cardinal (b. 1934)
 March 5 – Donald Woods, Canadian-American actor (b. 1906)
 March 7 
 Josep Escolà, Spanish footballer (b. 1914)
 Adem Jashari, Kosovo-Albanian militant separatist (b. 1955)
 March 10 – Lloyd Bridges, American actor (b. 1913)
 March 12
 Judge Dread, English musician (b. 1945)
 Beatrice Wood, American artist and ceramicist (b. 1893)
 March 13
 Bill Reid, Canadian artist (b. 1920)
 Hans von Ohain, German physicist (b. 1911)
 March 15 
 Benjamin Spock, American rower, pediatrician, and author (b. 1903)
 Dušan Pašek, Slovak ice hockey player (b. 1960)
 Tim Maia, Brazilian musician, songwriter and businessman (b. 1942)
 March 16 – Derek Barton, British chemist (b. 1918)
 March 25 – Daniel Massey, English actor (b. 1933)
 March 27 – Ferdinand Anton Ernst Porsche, Austrian auto designer and businessman (b. 1909)
 March 31 – Bella Abzug, American lawyer, feminist activist, and politician (b. 1920)

April

 April 1
 Gene Evans, American actor (b. 1920)
 Rozz Williams, American singer (b. 1963)
 April 3 
 Charles Lang, American cinematographer (b. 1901)
 Rob Pilatus, German singer and dancer (b. 1965)
 Wolf Vostell, German painter and sculptor (b. 1932)
 April 5 – Cozy Powell, English rock drummer (b. 1947)
 April 6
 Rudy Dhaenens, Belgian road bicycle racer (b. 1961)
 Wendy O. Williams, American singer (b. 1949)
 Tammy Wynette, American singer (b. 1942)
 April 11 – Rodney Harvey, American actor and model (b. 1967)
 April 13 – Patrick de Gayardon, French skydiver and skysurfing pioneer (b. 1960)
 April 15 – Pol Pot, 30th Prime Minister of Democratic Kampuchea and Cambodian Khmer Rouge leader (b. 1925)
 April 16
 Alberto Calderón, Argentine mathematician (b. 1920)
 Fred Davis, English snooker player (b. 1913)
 Marie-Louise Meilleur, Canadian supercentenarian (b. 1880)
 April 17 – Linda McCartney, American photographer and musician (b. 1941)
 April 18 – Terry Sanford, American politician (b. 1917)
 April 19 – Octavio Paz, Mexican diplomat and writer (b. 1914)
 April 21 – Jean-François Lyotard, French philosopher, sociologist, and literary theorist (b. 1924)
 April 23
 Konstantinos Karamanlis, Greek politician (b. 1907)
 James Earl Ray, American assassin (b. 1928)
 April 25 – Christian Mortensen, Danish supercentenarian (b. 1882)
 April 27
 Carlos Castaneda, American anthropologist and author (b. 1925)
 Anne Desclos, French writer (b. 1907)
 April 30 – Nizar Qabbani, Syrian diplomat, poet and publisher (b. 1923)

May

 May 1 – Eldridge Cleaver, American political activist and writer (b. 1935)
 May 2
 Justin Fashanu, British footballer (b. 1961)
 Hide, Japanese musician (b. 1964)
 Maidie Norman, American actress (b. 1912)
 May 3 
 Gene Raymond, American actor (b. 1908)
 Gojko Šušak, Croatian politician (b. 1945)
 May 5 – Frithjof Schuon, Swiss author, poet and painter (b. 1907)
 May 6 
 Chatichai Choonhavan, 17th Prime Minister of Thailand (b. 1920)
 Erich Mende, German politician (b. 1916)
 May 7
 Allan McLeod Cormack, South African–born physicist (b. 1924)
 Eddie Rabbitt, American musician (b. 1941)
 May 8 – Johannes Kotkas, Estonian heavyweight Greco-Roman wrestler (b. 1915)
 May 9 – Alice Faye, American actress and singer (b. 1915)
 May 10 – Clara Rockmore, American musician (b. 1911)
 May 14
 Marjory Stoneman Douglas, American conservationist and writer (b. 1890)
 Frank Sinatra, American actor and singer (b. 1915)
 May 15 
 Naim Talu, 15th Prime Minister of Turkey (b. 1919)
 Gunter D’Alquen, German journalist, propagandist, and SS unit commander (b. 1910)
 May 19 – Sōsuke Uno, 47th Prime Minister of Japan (b. 1922)
 May 21 – Douglas Fowley, American actor (b. 1911)
 May 22 – John Derek, American actor and film director (b. 1926)
 May 28 – Phil Hartman, Canadian-American actor, writer, and comedian (b. 1948)
 May 29
 Orlando Anderson, American criminal and gangster (b. 1974)
 Barry Goldwater, American politician (b. 1909)

June

 June 2 – Junkyard Dog, American pro wrestler (b. 1952)
 June 5 – Jeanette Nolan, American actress (b. 1911)
 June 8 – Sani Abacha, 10th President of Nigeria (b. 1943)
 June 9 
 Agostino Casaroli, 53rd Secretary of State of the Holy See (b. 1914)
 Lois Mailou Jones, American artist (b. 1905)
 June 10 – Hammond Innes, English author (b. 1914)
 June 11 – Dame Catherine Cookson, English author (b. 1906)
 June 13 – Birger Ruud, Norwegian athlete (b. 1911)
 June 20 – Conrad Schumann, East German border guard (b. 1942)
 June 23 – Maureen O'Sullivan, Irish-American actress (b. 1911)
 June 25 – Lounès Matoub, Algerian Berber singer (b. 1956)

July

 July 3 – Danielle Bunten Berry, American software developer (b. 1949)
 July 6 – Roy Rogers, American singer and actor (b. 1911)
 July 8 – Lilí Álvarez, Spanish tennis player, author, and feminist (b. 1905)
 July 14 – Nguyễn Ngọc Loan, South Vietnamese general (b. 1930)
 July 17 – Joseph Maher, Irish-born American actor (b. 1933)
 July 21
 Alan Shepard, American astronaut (b. 1923)
 Robert Young, American actor (b. 1907)
 July 22 – Hermann Prey, German bass-baritone (b. 1929)
 July 27 – Binnie Barnes, British-born American actress (b. 1903)
 July 30 – Buffalo Bob Smith, American children's television host (b. 1917)

August

 August 1 – Eva Bartok, Hungarian actress (b. 1927)
 August 2
 Otto Bumbel, Brazilian professional football manager (b. 1914)
 Shari Lewis, American ventriloquist (b. 1933)
 August 3 
 Reizo Koike, Japanese swimmer (b. 1915)
 Alfred Schnittke, Russian-born composer (b. 1934)
 August 4 – Yury Artyukhin, Russian cosmonaut (b. 1930)
 August 5 
 Otto Kretschmer, German U-boat commander (b. 1912)
 Todor Zhivkov, 6th President of Bulgaria (b. 1911)
 August 6 – André Weil, French mathematician (b. 1906)
 August 8 – László Szabó, Hungarian chess grandmaster (b. 1917)
 August 9 – Frankie Ruiz, American salsa singer and songwriter (b. 1958)
 August 13
 Nino Ferrer, French singer (b. 1934)
 Julien Green, French-born American writer (b. 1900)
 August 17 
 Władysław Komar, Polish track and field athlete (b. 1940)
 Raquel Rastenni, Danish singer (b. 1915)
 Tadeusz Ślusarski, Polish track and field athlete (b. 1950)
 August 18 – Persis Khambatta, Indian actress and model (b. 1948)
 August 19 – Vasily Arkhipov, Soviet Navy officer (b. 1926)
 August 20 – Vũ Văn Mẫu, 10th and final Prime Minister of South Vietnam (b. 1914)
 August 24 – E. G. Marshall, American actor (b. 1914)
 August 25 – Lewis F. Powell Jr., American Supreme Court Justice (b. 1907)
 August 26
 Wade Dominguez, American actor, model, singer, and dancer (b. 1966)
 Frederick Reines, American physicist (b. 1918)

September

 September 2
 Jackie Blanchflower, Northern Irish footballer (b. 1933)
 Allen Drury, American writer (b. 1918)
 September 5
 Willem Drees Jr., Dutch politician (b. 1922)
 Leo Penn, American actor and director (b. 1921)
 September 6 – Akira Kurosawa, Japanese screenwriter, producer, and director (b. 1910)
 September 8 – Leonid Kinskey, Russian-born actor (b. 1903)
 September 9 – Lucio Battisti, Italian singer (b. 1943)
 September 11 – Dane Clark, American actor (b. 1912)
 September 13 – George Wallace, American politician (b. 1919)
 September 14
 Yang Shangkun, 4th President of the People's Republic of China (b. 1907)
 Johnny Adams, American singer (b. 1932)
 September 15 – Fred Alderman, American sprint runner (b. 1905)
 September 19 – Patricia Hayes, British character actress and comedian (b. 1909)
 September 20 – Muriel Humphrey Brown, American politician (b. 1912)
 September 21 – Florence Griffith Joyner, American athlete (b. 1959)
 September 23 – Mary Frann, American actress (b. 1943)
 September 26 – Betty Carter, American jazz singer (b. 1929)
 September 30
 Bruno Munari, Italian-born industrial designer (b. 1907)
 Robert Lewis Taylor, American author (b. 1912)

October

 October 2
 Gene Autry, American actor, singer, and sports team owner (b. 1907)
 Olin J. Eggen, American astronomer (b. 1919)
 Olivier Gendebien, Belgian race car driver (b. 1924)
 October 3 – Roddy McDowall, British-born American actor (b. 1928)
 October 6 – Rolan Bykov, Soviet and Russian actor, director and producer (b. 1929)
 October 9 – Ian Johnson, Australian cricketer (b. 1917)
 October 10 – Clark Clifford, American lawyer and politician (b. 1906)
 October 11 – Richard Denning, American actor (b. 1914)
 October 12 – Matthew Shepard, American murder victim (b. 1976)
 October 16 – Jon Postel, American Internet pioneer (b. 1943)
 October 17 – Joan Hickson, British actress (b. 1906)
 October 22 – Eric Ambler, British writer (b. 1909)
 October 24 – Pino Dordoni, Italian athlete (b. 1926)
 October 26 – Kenkichi Iwasawa, Japanese mathematician (b. 1917)
 October 27 – Reidar Kvammen, Norwegian footballer (b. 1914)
 October 28 
 Tommy Flowers, English engineer (b. 1905)
 James Goldman, American writer (b. 1927)
 October 29 – Ted Hughes, English poet (b. 1930)
 October 30 – Apo Lazaridès, French cyclist (b. 1925)

November

 November 3 – Bob Kane, American comic book creator (b. 1915)
 November 5 – Momoko Kōchi, Japanese actress (b. 1932)
 November 6 
 Mohamed Taki Abdoulkarim, 5th President of the Comoros (b. 1936)
 Niklas Luhmann, German sociologist (b. 1927)
 November 8 – Jean Marais, French actor (b. 1913)
 November 10 
 Jean Leray, French mathematician (b. 1906)
 Mary Millar, British actress and singer (b. 1936)
 November 13
 Edwige Feuillère, French actress (b. 1907)
 Valerie Hobson, English actress (b. 1917)
 Red Holzman, American basketball coach (b. 1920)
 Hendrik Timmer, Dutch sportsman (b. 1904)
 November 15 
 Stokely Carmichael, Trinidadian-American civil rights activist (b. 1941)
 Jean Dalrymple, American theatre producer, manager, publicist, and playwright (b. 1902)
 Ludvík Daněk, Czechoslovak discus thrower (b. 1937)
 November 17 
 Efim Geller, Soviet chess player and grandmaster (b. 1925)
 Esther Rolle, American actress (b. 1920)
 November 19 
 Louis Dumont, French anthropologist (b. 1911)
 Alan J. Pakula, American film director (b. 1928)
 November 20 
 Roland Alphonso, Jamaican musician (b. 1931)
 Galina Starovoytova, Soviet dissident (b. 1946)
 November 22 – Stu Ungar, American professional poker player (b. 1953)
 November 25 – Flip Wilson, American actor and comedian (b. 1933)

December

 December 1 – Freddie Young, American cinematographer (b. 1902)
 December 2 – Mikio Oda, Japanese athlete (b. 1905)
 December 6 – César Baldaccini, French sculptor (b. 1921)
 December 7 – Martin Rodbell, American scientist (b. 1925)
 December 8 – Michael Craze, British actor (b 1942)
 December 9 – Archie Moore, American professional boxer (b. 1916)
 December 12 – Lawton Chiles, American politician (b. 1930)
 December 14 – Norman Fell, American actor (b. 1924)
 December 16 – William Gaddis, American writer (b. 1922)
 December 18 – Lev Dyomin, Russian cosmonaut (b. 1926)
 December 20
 Irene Hervey, American actress (b. 1909)
 Alan Hodgkin, British scientist (b. 1914)
 December 23 
 David Manners, Canadian-American actor (b. 1900)
 Michelle Thomas, American actress and comedian (b. 1968)
 December 25
 Richard Paul, American actor (b. 1940)
 John Pulman, English snooker player (b. 1923)
 December 29 – Don Taylor, American actor and film director (b. 1920)
 December 30 – Keisuke Kinoshita, Japanese film director (b. 1912)

Nobel Prizes

 Physics – Robert B. Laughlin, Horst L. Störmer, Daniel Chee Tsui
 Chemistry – Walter Kohn, John Pople
 Medicine – Robert F. Furchgott, Louis J. Ignarro, Ferid Murad
 Literature – José Saramago
 Peace – John Hume and David Trimble
 Bank of Sweden Prize in Economic Sciences in Memory of Alfred Nobel – Amartya Sen

Fields Medal
Richard Ewen Borcherds, William Timothy Gowers, Maxim Kontsevich, Curtis T. McMullen

References

External links

 1998 Year in Review - CNN/Sports Illustrated